The Indiana–Purdue rivalry is a rivalry between the Indiana University Bloomington Hoosiers and the Purdue University Boilermakers, the two flagship public universities in the state of Indiana. It is regarded as one of the most intense collegiate rivalries in the United States, and one of the strongest and most followed collegiate rivalries in the Big Ten Conference. Among all of college sports rivalries, Newsweek listed it among the top 12 and Huffington Post listed it as the fifth best rivalry overall.

The intensity of the rivalry is augmented by the deep passion within Indiana for basketball (see Hoosier Hysteria). Both universities have very large student bodies in the tens of thousands; Purdue is a land-grant research university located in the northern portion of Indiana that traditionally focuses on engineering, agriculture, and technology, while IU Bloomington is located in the southern portion of the state and primarily focuses on liberal arts, business, and music. However, both universities offer a wide range of academic programs. The geographic and academic divergence of the two institutions polarizes the state of Indiana into two large fan bases.

Purdue is the founding member of the Big Ten Conference and both universities have been members of the Big Ten for over 100 years, ensuring yearly competition across all sports and adding conference standing implications to the rivalry.

Men's basketball

Indiana and Purdue played against each other in men's basketball for the first time on March 2, 1901.  The two teams have played at least once a year since then, and until 2001 they usually met twice a year.  Purdue leads the all-time series 125-92. Purdue has won the Big Ten Conference regular season title 25 times, and Indiana has won it 22.  Since the Big Ten began basketball in the 1904–05 season, the schools have combined to win or share over 39% of the conference championships. Both are among the winningest programs in Division I basketball; through the end of the 2022-2023 season, Indiana is 10th on the list, while Purdue is 12th.

Additionally, Indiana has won 5 NCAA championships in basketball. Indiana was also voted the UPI National Champions in 1975.  Purdue was retroactively awarded the 1932 Helms Foundation and Premo-Porretta Power Poll national titles.  Both Indiana and Purdue have captured one post-season NIT championship; Purdue won in 1974 and Indiana won in 1979. The two teams also met in the postseason the following year in the 1980 NCAA Sweet 16, with Purdue winning on their way to the Final Four. That was their first, and only, head-to-head NCAA Tournament meeting. Although Indiana has achieved more on a national scale, the Boilermakers have the upper hand when it comes to this rivalry.

Purdue won 51 of the first 62 games through 1939, including four winning streaks of more than eight games. In 1940, Indiana won both yearly contests for the first time ever and went on to win their first NCAA Championship. The rivalry favored Indiana in the 1940s and 1950s, with the Hoosiers winning 25 out of the 37 games during the two decades. The intensity of the rivalry reached new heights throughout the 1970s, '80s, and '90s when Bob Knight and Gene Keady coached Indiana and Purdue, respectively. The two legends combined for 17 Big Ten titles and 13 Big Ten Coach of the Year awards while leading the Hoosiers and Boilers. The rivalry has become re-energized in recent years under Purdue's Matt Painter dominance and Indiana's constant changing of head coaches, helping restore the rivalry. ESPN has labeled the basketball rivalry as "one of the two or three best rivalries in the sport," while College Magazine ranked it as the 10th best college basketball rivalry and TotalProSports listed it as the seventh best.

Notable games and incidents

Disputed 1901 game
Indiana and Purdue first met on March 2, 1901 in Bloomington, with a 20-15 Purdue win. Indiana originally planned to play a second game against Purdue in West Lafayette, but according to the Arbutus (the Indiana school yearbook) those games were "declared off, and the season ended at Indiana." The official records of Indiana and Purdue indicate that Indiana lost to Purdue 23–19 in West Lafayette on March 15, 1901. However, the Indiana University Basketball Encyclopedia by Jason Hiner notes that an absence of newspaper reports about the game suggests that it never took place. That source lists Indiana's record for the 1900–01 season as 1-3.

1969: Mauling at Mackey
On March 8, 1969, and on their way to the 1969 National Championship game, the Boilermakers trounced the Hoosiers 120-76 behind 40 from Rick Mount and 31 from Billy Keller. Indiana coach Lou Watson remarked after the game, "I'm so glad that's over. That Keller killed us." The Boilermakers would eventually fall 92-72 to the UCLA Bruins in the 1969 National Championship Game.

1976: Undefeated Season

On February 16, 1976, IU defeated Purdue at Mackey Arena 74-71.  This victory was IU's 6th in a row over Purdue.  The Indiana Hoosiers would go on to finish the Big Ten undefeated at 18-0 for the second season in a row and win their 4th straight Big Ten Championship.  The Indiana Hoosiers would also go on to finish the season undefeated at 32-0 and win the school's 3rd National Championship: no other D-1 basketball program has finished a season undefeated since IU did so in 1976. The Hoosiers only lost one game during the 1974–75 and 1975-76 seasons, which has also not been accomplished by any D-1 program since during a 2 season period.

1979: NIT Championship
After splitting the regular season series at one win apiece, Indiana and No. 15 ranked Purdue met on March 21, 1979 in the final game of the 1979 NIT Championship. Going toe to toe during this game was Indiana star Ray Tolbert. Tolbert would go on to receive co-MVP honors for the NIT Tournament. Purdue's Joe Berry Carroll would be the main star for the Boilermakers. Indiana squeaked by with a 53–52 win in the first-ever post-season meeting between the Hoosiers and Boilermakers.

1980: NCAA Sweet 16
On March 13, 1980, No. 7 ranked Indiana faced No. 20 Purdue in the 1980 NCAA Sweet 16, held in Lexington. This is the only time the two schools have ever met in the NCAA Tournament. Although Indiana freshman Isiah Thomas scored 30 points, Purdue ultimately won the game 76-69 behind 20 points from Keith Edmonson and Drake Morris. Purdue reached the Final Four before losing to UCLA.  Purdue has not been to the Final Four since 1980.

1981: "Sucker punch" and jackass feud
In a game at Bloomington on January 31, 1981 between Indiana and Purdue, Hoosier star Isiah Thomas hit Purdue guard Roosevelt Barnes with a sucker punch. When the two schools played their second game of the season at Purdue on February 7, 1981, Knight claimed a number of derisive chants were directed at him, his wife, and Indiana University. In response Knight invited Purdue athletic director George King on his weekly television show to discuss the matter, but King declined. Therefore, in place of King, Knight brought onto the show a "jackass" (male donkey) wearing a Purdue hat as a representative of Purdue. The 1980–81 Hoosiers would go on to win the 1981 NCAA National Championship, the school's fourth national title.

1985: Knight chair throwing incident
The February 23, 1985 game at Bloomington between Purdue and Indiana would provide a defining moment in the Indiana-Purdue basketball rivalry. Just five minutes into the game, a scramble for a loose ball resulted in a foul call on Indiana's Steve Alford. Knight, irate, insisted the call should have been for a jump ball and seconds later after the Purdue inbounds, a subsequent foul was called on Daryl Thomas. Knight ultimately received a technical foul and then preceded to throw a red plastic chair from Indiana's bench across the floor toward the basket and received his 2nd technical. Knight continued until he received a 3rd technical and was ejected from the game by NCAA rule (since then, NCAA rules have changed so that two technical fouls earn an automatic ejection).

Knight was ejected, but he received a standing ovation as he left the floor from the home crowd at Assembly Hall, and the crowd  quickly became hostile and dangerous. Fans went so far as to throw coins at the Purdue bench after Knight's ejection. Despite the crowd, Purdue went on to defeat Indiana 72–63 on their way to a 20–9 season, while Indiana finished the year 16–13 and missed the NCAA tournament.

Knight apologized for his actions the next day and was given a one-game suspension and two years probation from the Big Ten. Since the incident, Knight has occasionally joked about throwing the chair. A common joke told by Knight is that he saw an old lady standing on the opposite sideline and threw her the chair so she could sit down. The picture of Knight throwing the red plastic chair across the floor in front of Reid has since become the symbol of the Indiana–Purdue rivalry. Replays of the toss have been shown during nearly every match-up at Mackey Arena since 1985.

1987: High ranked duels
On January 31, 1987, Indiana and Purdue met for the first time with both teams ranked in the Top 10; coincidentally, they were tied in the AP poll at #4. Indiana won the first meeting of the year in Bloomington 88–77. In their second match-up, on February 26, 1987 in West Lafayette, both teams came into the game still ranked in the Top 10 (Purdue at #6 and Indiana at #3). Indiana All-American Steve Alford was held to only 1 point in the first half as Purdue led by 9 points at the break. Behind 18 points from Troy Lewis, Purdue won 75-64. Despite the loss, the 1986–87 Hoosiers would go on to win the 1987 NCAA National Championship, the school's 5th national title.

1991: Knight tirade
At a practice leading up to an Indiana-Purdue game in West Lafayette in 1991, Bob Knight unleashed a torrent of expletives and threats designed to motivate his Indiana team. In one portion he exclaims he is "f**king tired of losing to Purdue." Unknown to most, someone was secretly taping the speech. The speech has since gone viral and has over 1.83 million views on YouTube alone. Although the source of who taped the speech remains unknown, many former players suspect it was former manager and current NBA coach Lawrence Frank. Indiana would go on to beat Purdue 65-62.

1997: Keady milestone
In a February 18, 1997 game at Bloomington, No. 24 ranked Indiana was led by 31 points from freshman A. J. Guyton, including a three-pointer to tie the game at 87 in overtime. However, Purdue's Chad Austin hit the game winner with 0.6 seconds left in overtime to give Purdue their 4th win in a row against the Hoosiers. It was practically an instant replay from the previous season when Austin sank a three-pointer with 13.7 seconds left to lift Purdue to a 74-72 win in Bloomington. Austin scored 18 and Purdue freshman Brian Cardinal added 25 points in the 1997 game. The victory was the 400th of Gene Keady's career.

2002: Duel in the Dome
The Big Ten had featured an imbalanced conference schedule since increasing to 11 members in 1993, and it finally reached the Indiana–Purdue rivalry as the two were only scheduled for one meeting in each of the 2001–02 and 2002-03 seasons. However, the two schools planned a non-conference game for December 14, 2002, at the RCA Dome in Indianapolis. The game was nicknamed the "Duel in the Dome" and a total of 32,055 Hoosier and Boiler fans filled into the Dome to see the game.

The #7 ranked Hoosiers held off Purdue 66–63 in the game. Indiana jumped out early and led by as many as six points at 17–11 before Purdue used a 12–1 run to go ahead by six points themselves at 27–21. But Indiana closed the gap and at halftime Purdue led 29–27. After only one lead change in the first half, the second half featured 5 ties and 9 lead changes as the teams battled back and forth. Indiana took the lead for good at 50–49 with 5:36 left, but Purdue never trailed by more than five points and the game wasn't over until Jeff Newton stole Purdue's inbound pass with a second left. Newton scored 16 points to lead the Hoosiers, including 9 crucial points in the final three minutes.

2005: Double overtime
On January 15, 2005, Indiana and Purdue faced off in Mackey Arena in what would be Keady's final home game of the rivalry. Purdue had led the entire game until Indiana used a 14–0 run to take a four point lead with twelve minutes remaining in the second half. The teams battled back and forth until David Teague gave Purdue a 55–52 lead with only 25 seconds remaining. However, Indiana's Marshall Strickland tied the game on a three-point play to send the game into overtime.

In the first overtime, the Hoosiers and Boilermakers were tied at 61 when a foul was called on Purdue's Andrew Ford with 0.9 seconds remaining.  Strickland hit two free throws to give Indiana the lead. But Purdue heaved a pass to the opposite end of the court where Carl Landry made a layup and was fouled as he shot. After reviewing the call on video replay, the referees ruled that although Landry had released the shot after the buzzer, he had been fouled before time expired.  They allowed continuation and counted the basket. However, Landry ended up missing the ensuing free-throw with no time on the clock, and the teams went to double-overtime tied at 63.

In the second overtime, Indiana had a 74–70 lead before Teague hit a three-pointer with 5.7 seconds remaining to pull Purdue within one. Bracey Wright then made one free throw for Indiana, and Purdue's Brandon McKnight missed a last-second heave to make the final score 75–73 in favor of the Hoosiers. This was the first, and thus far only, double-overtime game in the history of the Indiana-Purdue basketball series.

2008: Sampson's finale
On February 19, 2008 No. 15 ranked Indiana faced No. 14 ranked Purdue in Bloomington. It would be the Hoosiers' last game before the completion of the school's investigation into accusations that Kelvin Sampson committed major rules violations, and would ultimately be Sampson's final game as Indiana's head coach as he would resign two days later. Hoosier star Eric Gordon scored 22 points to lead Indiana to a 77–68 victory. The win snapped Purdue's 11-game winning streak and brought Indiana within one-half game of the Boilermakers at the top of the Big Ten conference standings.

2017: Tie-Breaker for Big Ten Titles

On February 27, 2017, No.16 ranked Purdue faced the defending Big Ten Champion but unranked Hoosiers in Mackey Arena. The previous year Indiana won the Big Ten Regular Season Title to join Purdue with 22 conference titles, tied for the most in conference history. Ninety minutes before game time, the pedestrian areas around Mackey Arena were overflowing with bodies and when the gates opened 60 minutes prior to tip the entire student section was filled in minutes. Caleb Swanigan led the way with 21 points with Dakota Mathias adding 19 points to lead Purdue to a 86-75 victory. This victory clinched a share of the Big Ten Conference Championship for Purdue's 23rd all-time title, which put them alone in first place.

2019: Profane Chants Game

On February 19, 2019, No. 16 ranked Purdue played unranked Indiana at Assembly Hall in what can only be called a rock-fight of a game. The two teams combined for only 94 points, the lowest combined score in the rivalry since 1950. The game was laced with profane chants from the IU fanbase aimed at Purdue's 7'3" Sophomore Matt Haarms, after Haarms was involved in two loose ball battles with De'Ron Davis and received a technical foul on the second scuffle. The chants could be heard clearly on the TV and radio broadcast with the fan base yelling "F--- You Haarms". As the defensive struggle continued, and the game tied at 46 a piece, Purdue put the ball in the hands of their All-American Junior Guard Carsen Edwards who struggled all night from the field. With 5 seconds remaining, his shot went off the back heel and Matt Haarms rose over Indiana's Juwan Morgan and tipped the rebound back in with his left hand for the game winner with 3.1 seconds remaining.

After the game, IU athletic director Fred Glass called his counterpart at Purdue, Mike Bobinski, and apologized for the profane chants. Former Indiana great Alan Henderson also weighed in on the controversy via Twitter to say "we should not hear curse chants at opponents, that's not what Indiana basketball is about." Purdue would go on to win a share of the Big Ten Conference Title for their league-leading 24th title.

Results
Ranking of the team at the time of the game is shown next to the team name. Purdue leads the all-time head-to-head series with Indiana 125–90.

Football

Indiana and Purdue first met in football in 1891.  The rivalry has been renewed annually during every peacetime season since then, except when the 1903 game was called off due to nearly the entire Purdue team dying in a train wreck.  In 1908 the two schools began a tradition of concluding their regular seasons by playing each other.  This tradition has been interrupted only occasionally (World War I, 9/11 (game with ND moved to 12/1), late season games @ Hawaii), but for the most part, Indiana and Purdue have ended the season by playing each other. Purdue leads the all-time series 75–42–6.

In 1925 the teams played for the Old Oaken Bucket for the first time. While the presentation of the trophy dates 86 years, the bucket itself is more than 100 years old. The winner of the bucket gets a "P" or "I" link added to the chain of the bucket with the score, date and the city where the game was played engraved on the link. In case of a tie, an "I–P" link is added. The first Old Oaken Bucket game ended in a 0–0 tie, resulting in the first "I-P" link.  Purdue leads the all-time Bucket series 59–31–3.

When the Big Ten expanded to 14 teams in 2014 and the conference realigned into geographically based divisions, Indiana and Purdue were placed in opposite divisions (respectively East and West). The Indiana–Purdue game is the only protected cross-division rivalry in the new setup, ensuring that the Old Oaken Bucket will still be contested every year.

Other sports

The rivalry between Indiana and Purdue has spilled over into other arenas. Beginning in the fall of 2001, the rivalry was strengthened by the creation of an official rivalry cup. It was introduced in the fall of 2001 as the Titan Series, but renamed the Crimson and Gold Cup in the fall of 2004 and the Governor's Cup in 2013. The schools accumulate points based on the results of head-to-head competition or standings at the Big Ten championships for shared varsity sports, and the program with the most points at the end of the year wins the trophy. From the cup's establishment through the 2018–19 season Indiana has claimed the cup 8 times, Purdue has won the cup 7 times, and the schools have tied twice.

Other sports also have their own traveling trophy. In addition to the Old Oaken Bucket in football, there is the Monon Spike in volleyball, which was introduced in 1981 as reminder of the competition on the court as well as a reference to the historic Monon Railroad in the state. As with its sister trophy, the Old Oaken Bucket, a "P" or an "I" link is added to the chain signifying the season's winner. In women's basketball there is the Barn Burner Trophy, which was introduced during the 1993–94 season. It is a wood plaque with a drawing of a barn and an attached basketball hoop. Women's soccer also features the Golden Boot, introduced in 2002. After each victory, the winning team takes the trophy home and adds a letter to the chain attached to the gold-dipped soccer shoe. On each letter is engraved the date and score of the match it represents.

Men's soccer 
The two programs played each other in men's soccer from 1973 when Indiana began fielding a men's soccer program until 1985, when Purdue disbanded their program.

References

External links
 NCAA 'convinced' that basketball championship would prosper by Kay Hawes (NCAA News Century Series)

College basketball rivalries in the United States
College sports rivalries in the United States
Big Ten Conference rivalries
Indiana University
Purdue University
Indiana Hoosiers basketball
Purdue Boilermakers basketball
1891 establishments in Indiana